Amanda Collin (born 1986) is a Danish actress, known for A Horrible Woman (2017), Department Q: A Conspiracy of Faith (2016) and Splitting Up Together (2016). She plays Mother in the HBO Max series Raised by Wolves.

Early life 
Amanda Collin was born on 4 March 1986 in Denmark.

Career 
From 2015–16, Collin was part of the Mungo Park Theatre ensemble, where she played in Hans Christian Andersen's fairytales, Boys Don't Cry and Hamlet. In 2017, Collin was nominated for the Danish equivalent of the Academy Award, the Robert Award, for her supporting role of Rakel, the religious mother of two kidnapped children in the Danish box office hit Department Q: A Conspiracy of Faith directed by Hans Petter Moland.

Collin played the leading role of Marie in the film A Horrible Woman, and won both the Robert Award and the Bodil Award for Best Actress in a Leading Role in 2018.

In 2019 Collin appeared in Daniel Borgman's Resin for which she was nominated for a Robert Award for Best Actress in a Supporting Role. She currently stars in Aaron Guzikowski's sci-fi drama series Raised by Wolves from HBO Max.

Filmography

Film

Television

Music videos

References

External links 

 

Living people
1986 births
21st-century Danish actresses
Amanda
Danish film actresses
Danish television actresses